Pir Musa (also Romanized as Pīr Mūsá) is a village in Firuraq Rural District, in the Central District of Khoy County, West Azerbaijan Province, Iran. At the 2006 census, its population was 544, in 122 families.

References 

Populated places in Khoy County